Ždírec is a municipality and village in Plzeň-South District in the Plzeň Region of the Czech Republic. It has about 500 inhabitants.

Administrative parts
Villages of Myť, Smederov and Žďár are administrative parts of Ždírec.

References

Villages in Plzeň-South District